"Love Changes (Everything)" is a 1987 single by British pop duo Climie Fisher that gained international success after a re-release in 1988. The song was later covered and released by house music duo Musikk. Songwriters Simon Climie, Dennis Morgan and Rob Fisher received the 1988 Ivor Novello award for Best Song Musically and Lyrically.

Original version 
Climie Fisher wrote the song thinking that Rod Stewart could sing it, but Stewart turned it down and they released the song in 1987. Initially it received poor sales and airplay, reaching number 67 in the UK and number 30 in the Netherlands. After the success of the hip-hop version of "Rise to the Occasion", the song was re-released with a slight remix by Bob Clearmountain in 1988 and reached number two in the UK.

"Love Changes (Everything)" also reached number two in South Africa, number seven in Germany, number eight in Switzerland, number 15 in Austria, number 23 in Australia, number 23 in the US Hot 100 and number 16 on the U.S. Dance Music/Club Play Singles and number 12 on the Adult Contemporary chart.

AllMusic journalist Michael Sutton described Climie Fisher's version of the song as having "a chorus that adheres to the brain like glue. In limited doses it's as tasty as a chocolate sundae."

Track listing 
7-inch EMI / EM 15 (UK, 1987)

 "Love Changes (Everything)"
 "Never Close the Show"

12-inch EMI / 12 EM 15 (UK, 1987)

 "Love Changes (Everything)" (Love Mix) – 7:42
 "Love Changes (Everything)" (7-inch Version) – 4:35
 "Never Close the Show" – 4:03

7-inch Capitol Records / B-44137 (US & Canada, 1987)

 "Love Changes (Everything)" – 3:54
 "Never Close the Show" – 4:04

CD EMI / CD EM 15 (UK, 1987)

 "Love Changes (Everything) – 4:36
 "This Is Me" – 3:49
 "Rise to the Occasion" – 4:46
 "Never Let a Chance Go By" – 4:32

7-inch EMI / EM 47 (UK, 1988)

 "Love Changes (Everything)"
 "Never Close the Show"

12-inch EMI / 12 EM 47 (UK, 1988)

 "Love Changes (Everything)" (Extended Mix) – 7:45
 "Love Changes (Everything)" (House Mix) – 7:47
 "Never Close the Show" – 4:04

12-inch Capitol Records / V-15373 (US & Canada, 1988)

 "Love Changes (Everything)" (House Mix) – 7:47
 "Love Changes (Everything)" (Single Mix) – 4:28
 "Love Changes (Everything)" (Dance Mix) – 7:45
 "Love Changes (Everything)" (Pop Mix) – 6:14

CD EMI / CD EM 47 (UK, 1988)

 "Love Changes (Everything)" – 4:30
 "Rise to the Occasion" (Hip Hop Remix) – 5:39
 "Never Close the Show" – 4:02
 "Love Changes (Everything)" (Extended Mix) – 5:44

Charts

Weekly charts

Year-end charts

Musikk version 

Musikk released a cover in 2004 and as a digital download on 24 May 2005. The song peaked at No. 2 on the Danish Singles Chart. It features vocals from Danish singer Jon Nørgaard under the name John Rock.

Track listing 
Digital download
 "Love Changes (Everything)" (Original Radio Edit) - 3:50
 "Love Changes (Everything)" (Original Club Mix) - 5:37
 "Love Changes (Everything)" (Monday Morning Remix Edit) - 4:37
 "Love Changes (Everything)" (U-Facilities Remix Edit) - 3:38
 "Love Changes (Everything)" (Monday Morning Remix) - 8:07
 "Love Changes (Everything)" (U-Facilities Club Mix) - 7:48
 "Love Changes (Everything)" (Instrumental) - 3:50
 "Love Changes (Everything)" (Acapella) - 3:49

Chart performance

Release history

References

1987 singles
1987 songs
1988 singles
2004 singles
Climie Fisher songs
EMI Records singles
Jon Nørgaard songs
Number-one singles in Portugal
Song recordings produced by Stephen Hague
Songs written by Dennis Morgan (songwriter)
Songs written by Rob Fisher (British musician)
Songs written by Simon Climie